Mohamed Mansoor Mohamed Ibrahim (born 28 October 1965) also known by his Initial M. I. M. Mansoor is a Sri Lankan politician and current member of parliament for Digamadulla District. He contested from United National Party and was elected to the parliament on 17 August 2015. Originally he is a Sri Lanka Muslim Congress member.

References 

Sri Lankan Muslims
Sri Lanka Muslim Congress politicians
United National Party politicians
Living people
1965 births